Cynan ab Iago (c. 1014  c. 1063) was a Welsh prince of the House of Aberffraw sometimes credited with briefly reigning as King of Gwynedd. His father, Iago ab Idwal ap Meurig, had been king before him and his son, Gruffudd, was king after him.

Iago was King of Gwynedd from 1023 to 1039 but was killed (possibly by his own men) while Cynan was still young. The throne was seized by Gruffydd ap Llywelyn, a member of a cadet branch of the royal dynasty. Cynan fled to Ireland and took refuge in the Viking settlement at Dublin. He married Ragnailt, the daughter of its King Olaf Sigtryggsson and granddaughter of King Sigtrygg Silkbeard. Ragnailt appeared on the list of the "Fair Women of Ireland" in the Book of Leinster and was also descended from Brian Boru.

Cynan may have died fairly soon after the birth of their son Gruffudd, as the 13th-century History of Gruffydd ap Cynan details Cynan's ancestry but omits him from its account of Gruffudd's youth. Instead, Gruffudd's mother tells him about his father and the patrimony he should claim across the sea. Following two major Saxon invasions under Harold and Tostig Godwinson, Gruffydd ap Llywelyn was killed in 1063: the later Welsh Brut y Tywysogion reported he was done in by his own men, while the Ulster Chronicle stated he was killed by Cynan ab Iago. This may account for later records in Gwynedd calling Cynan a king or, alternatively, it may simply have been an honorary title on account of his family. If Cynan ruled, it was very briefly, for Bleddyn ap Cynfyn was installed by the Saxons the same year.

Children

 Gruffudd

References

Ancestral Roots of Certain American Colonists Who Came to America Before 1700 by Frederick Lewis Weis, Line 239-4

Welsh princes
House of Aberffraw
Monarchs of Gwynedd
11th-century Welsh monarchs
1010s births
1060s deaths
Year of birth uncertain
Year of death uncertain